WAFZ may refer to:

 WAFZ (AM), a radio station (1490 AM) licensed to Immokalee, Florida, United States
 WAFZ-FM, a radio station (92.1 FM) licensed to Immokalee, Florida, United States